Benjamin Hilborn Oehlert Jr. (September 13, 1909 – June 2, 1985) was an American lawyer, business executive, and diplomat.

Career
He was born in Philadelphia to Benjamin Hilborn Oehlert Sr. and Sarah Landis Oehlert. He graduated from the Wharton School and the University of Pennsylvania School of Law in 1930 and 1933, respectively. Upon graduation from law school, Oehlert went into private practice in his hometown. In 1935, Oehlert was hired by the Department of State and worked in the Mexican Claims Agency. Three years later, he joined The Coca-Cola Company. He left Coca-Cola in 1948 for the W. R. Grace and Company, where he was named vice president and Grace National Bank director. Shortly after W.R. Grace acquired Davison Chemical, Oehlert was named to Davison's board of directors. He returned to Coca-Cola in 1954 and served as president of Coca-Cola subsidiary Minute Maid from 1961 to 1965. By 1967, when he was selected to succeed Eugene M. Locke as ambassador to Pakistan, Oehlert had become senior vice president of The Coca-Cola Company. Oelhert served as ambassador until 1969.

Personal
Oehlert was married to Alice Naomi Greene from 1937 until her death on November 25, 1984. He died on June 2, 1985 in West Palm Beach, Florida. They had two children, son Benjamin Hilborn Oehlert III and daughter Wendy Howe Oehlert.

References

External links

1909 births
1985 deaths
Ambassadors of the United States to Pakistan
Coca-Cola people
People from West Palm Beach, Florida
Lawyers from Philadelphia
Wharton School of the University of Pennsylvania alumni
University of Pennsylvania Law School alumni
20th-century American lawyers